This is an alphabetical list of the oomycotal taxa recorded from South Africa.

A
Family: Albuginaceae 

Genus: Albugo 
Albugo austro-africana Syd.
Albugo candida Kunze.
Albugo candida f. heliophilae P.Henn.
Albugo cubicus
Albugo evansii Syd.
Albugo tragopogonis (Pers.) Gray (1821),accepted as Pustula tragopogonis (Pers.) Thines 2005 
Albugo sp.

P
Genus: Peronospora 
Peronospora destructor Casp. 
Peronospora effusa (Grev.) Rabenh. (1854)
Peronospora euphorbiae Tuck. 
Peronospora mesembryanthemi Verw. 
Peronospora obovata Bon. 
Peronospora oxalidis Verw. & du Pless. 
Peronospora parasitica Tul. accepted as Hyaloperonospora parasitica (Pers.) Constant., 2002 (Oomycota)
Peronospora rumicis Corda. 
Peronospora schleideni Ung. 
Peronospora trifoliorum de Bary. 
Peronospora viciae de Bary.

Family: Peronosporaceae 

Order: Peronosporales

Genus: Pseudoperonospora 
Pseudoperonospora cubensis Berk. & Curt.

Family: Pythiaceae

Genus: Pythium 
Pythium acanthicum Drechsl.
Pythium aphanidermatum Fitz.
Pythium artotrogus
Pythium debaryanum Hesse.
Pythium debaryanum var. pelargonii Braun
Pythium fabae Cheney.
Pythium irregulare Buisman.
Pythium myriotylum Drechsl.
Pythium oligandrum Drechsl.
Pythium spinosum Saw.
Pythium splendens Braun.
Pythium ultimum Trow.
Pythium vexans de Bary (1876), accepted as Phytopythium vexans (de Bary) Abad, de Cock, Bala, Robideau, A.M.Lodhi & Lévesque (2014)
Pythium sp.

S
Genus: Saprolegnia 
Saprolegnia ferox Nees.

Family: Saprolegniaceae

Order: Saprolegniales

References

Sources

  

Oomyces
Water moulds